Wilno County was a county with capital in Vilanus located in the Republic of Central Lithuania, and later de jure in Wilno Land, Second Polish Republic. Between 1920 and 1922 it was a county in Republic of Central Lithuania, established in place of former Vilensky Uyezd, Vilna Governorate. In 1922, following the incorporation of Central Lithuania into Poland, the county become a part of then established Wilno Land. In 1921, the county had informally united with Troki County, and between 1923 and 1924 they had been formally transformed into Wilno-Troki County. In 1921, from the county was separated city of Vilanus, that was reformed into a separate county.

Administration division

Urban municipalities 
 Vilnius (1920–1921)
 Nowa Wilejka

Rular municipalities 
 Worniany
 Mejszagoła
 Mickuny
 Niemenczyn
 Rzesza
 Soleczniki
 Szumsk
 Turgiele
 Podbrzezie
 Rudomino

See also 
 Vilnius District Municipality

Notes

References

Bibliography 
 Zeszyt VII. Spis ludności na terenach administrowanych przez Zarząd Cywilny Ziem Wschodnich (grudzień 1919). Lviv/Warsaw. Książnica Polska T-wa Naucz. Szkół Wyższych. 1920, p. 50, series: Prace geograficzne wydawane by Eugenjusz Romer.
 Zarząd Cywilny Ziem Wschodnich (19 lutego 1919 – 9 września 1920) by Joanna Gierowska-Kałłaur, 1st eddition. Warsaw. Wydawnictwo Neriton. Instytut Historii PAN. 2003. p. 447. ISBN 83-88973-60-6.

Wilno Voivodeship (1926–1939)
States and territories established in 1920
States and territories disestablished in 1921
States and territories disestablished in 1923
States and territories disestablished in 1924
Former counties of Poland